The Daimler L14 was a two-seat, high-wing, monoplane fighter built in 1919. It was built as a two-person, aerodynamically improved version of the Daimler L11 aircraft. It was powered by the Daimler D.IIIb water-cooled V-8 engine and was armed with two  machine guns, one forward and one rearward firing. One prototype was built. The L14V, an unbuilt mail carrier variant was offered for sale to Chile but no orders followed.

Specifications (L14)

References

Bibliography

 

1910s German fighter aircraft
L14
Single-engined tractor aircraft
Parasol-wing aircraft
Aircraft first flown in 1919